Turbo haraldi is a species of sea snail, marine gastropod mollusk in the family Turbinidae.

Distribution
Distribution of Turbo haraldi include Belize, Caribbean Sea, Colombia, Lesser Antilles and Panama.

Description 
The maximum recorded shell length is 25 mm.

Habitat 
Minimum recorded depth is 50 m. Maximum recorded depth is 100 m.

References
This article incorporates CC-BY-SA-3.0 text from the reference

 Alf A. & Kreipl K. (2003). A Conchological Iconography: The Family Turbinidae, Subfamily Turbininae, Genus Turbo. Conchbooks, Hackenheim Germany.
 Williams, S.T. (2007). Origins and diversification of Indo-West Pacific marine fauna: evolutionary history and biogeography of turban shells (Gastropoda, Turbinidae). Biological Journal of the Linnean Society, 2007, 92, 573–592.

External links

haraldi
Gastropods described in 1957